António de Oliveira Caetano (born 5 July 1966) is a Portuguese former footballer who played as a left back, and a manager.

Club career
Born in Feira (Santa Maria da Feira), Caetano played 16 uninterrupted Primeira Liga seasons, appearing in exactly 300 league matches for Boavista FC (three different spells, making his professional debut at only 17), C.F. Estrela da Amadora – helping the Lisbon club to the Taça de Portugal in his second year – Vitória de Guimarães,  C.F. Os Belenenses and S.C. Beira-Mar, retiring from the professional game in 1999 at the age of 33.

In the 2000s he worked as a manager, mainly in the lower league and also as an assistant and with Boavista's juniors. In the 2002–03 campaign, he was in charge of Segunda Liga team C.D. Aves for 11 games.

Honours
Estrela da Amadora
Taça de Portugal: 1989–90

Boavista
Supertaça Cândido de Oliveira: 1992

Beira-Mar
Taça de Portugal: 1998–99

References

External links

1966 births
Living people
Portuguese footballers
Association football defenders
Primeira Liga players
Segunda Divisão players
C.D. Feirense players
Boavista F.C. players
C.F. Estrela da Amadora players
Vitória S.C. players
C.F. Os Belenenses players
S.C. Beira-Mar players
Portugal youth international footballers
Portugal under-21 international footballers
Portuguese football managers
Liga Portugal 2 managers
C.D. Feirense managers
C.D. Aves managers
Académico de Viseu F.C. managers
Portuguese expatriate football managers
Expatriate football managers in China
Portuguese expatriate sportspeople in China
Sportspeople from Aveiro District